Roskilde Avis is a weekly newspaper published in Roskilde, Denmark. It is today owned by Sjællandske Medier.

History
Roskilde Avis was founded in 1829 by merchant J. H. T. Gemzøe. The newspaper was in 1950 owned and published by Svend Jacobsen (born 1894). He was also the owner of Roskilde Avis Bogtrykkeri.

Today
Roskilde Mediecenter was from 1897 owned by Sjællandske Medier (50 %) and Politikens Lokalaviser (50 %). The company published Roskilde Avis Midtuge (Roskilde Newspaper Mid-Week) and Roskilde Avis Weekend (Roskilde Newspaper Weekend), both with a circulation of 50,000 in the Roskilde area. On 1 December 2016, Sjællandske Medier acquired Politikens Lokalaviser's share of the company.

References 

Weekly newspapers published in Denmark
Danish-language newspapers
Danish companies established in 1829
Newspapers established in 1829